RSSA  may refer to:
 Royal Scottish Society of Arts
 Royal Society of South Africa
 Royal Society of South Australia